Lang is a village in Howmeh Rural District, in the Central District of Masal County, Gilan Province, Iran. At the 2006 census, its population was 458, in 121 families.

References 

Populated places in Masal County